Erwan Belhadji (born 22 June 2001) is a French professional football player.

Club career 
Erwan Belhadji made his professional debut for Dijon on the 23 May 2021.

Personal life
Belhadji was born in France and is of Senegalese descent. He is the cousin of the footballer Mamadou Thiam.

References

External links

2001 births
Living people
Sportspeople from Créteil
French footballers
French sportspeople of Senegalese descent
Association football forwards
Dijon FCO players
Ligue 1 players
Ligue 2 players
Championnat National 3 players
Footballers from Val-de-Marne